Edward Dezmon White (born August 23, 1979) is a former American football wide receiver in the National Football League (NFL). White was selected in the third round of the 2000 NFL Draft by the Chicago Bears and had a brief stint with the Atlanta Falcons. White attended the Bolles School in Jacksonville, Florida, where he played on the state championship football team in 1995 and the state runners-up team in 1996. White played college football at Georgia Tech.

References

External links
 

1979 births
Living people
American football wide receivers
Atlanta Falcons players
Chicago Bears players
Georgia Tech Yellow Jackets football players
Bolles School alumni
People from Orange Park, Florida
Players of American football from Jacksonville, Florida